The Arava Institute for Environmental Studies (AIES) is an academic studies and research institute located at Kibbutz Ketura on the Israeli side of the Arava Valley. Under the motto that "nature knows no borders", AIES seeks to train future leaders of the Middle East in environmental issues so that they will be able to cooperate in solving regional environmental problems. The Arava is a sparsely populated desert valley that connects the Dead Sea region with the Red Sea, and is part of the Jordan Rift Valley. Between the Dead Sea and the cities of Eilat and Aqaba, the Arava forms the border between Israel and Jordan.

Kibbutz Ketura, founded in 1973 by members of Young Judaea, is located only a few hundred meters from the border between Israel and Jordan. Kibbutz Ketura is one of a small number of intentional communities in Israel, and that makes it an ideal setting for a culturally diverse program. Members of the Kibbutz are both religious and non-religious Jews who have chosen to live together in the same community and maintain an egalitarian synagogue. The kibbutz is also a member of Israel's Green Kibbutzim movement, which seeks to promote environmentally friendly and sustainable practices. A portion of the kibbutz's agricultural produce is organic.

Students and academic programs 
Students at the Arava Institute live on Kibbutz Ketura while taking classes in sustainable development, water management, environmental law, economic policy, environmental science, and other topics in environmental studies. Classes are taught in English. Members of the faculty are often guest lecturers from universities, both in Israel and abroad, or professionals in fields such as public policy and water management.

Students come from around the world to study and conduct research at the Arava Institute. Since its founding in 1996, the Arava Institute has hosted over 800 graduate and undergraduate students of various nationalities, including Israeli Jewish, Israeli Arab, Palestinian, Jordanian, Egyptian, Tunisian, Moroccan, European and American students. The Arava Institute has been able to maintain a diverse student body even during very difficult times elsewhere in Israel and the Middle East.

AIES students can participate in semester and year-long programs accredited through Ben Gurion University as well as two master's degree graduate programs granted by Ben-Gurion University – one in Environmental Desert Studies and the other a "Green" MBA that teaches environmental sustainability and efficiency as well as business management skills. A three-week summer course is sometimes offered to study biodiversity and environmental challenges in the Arava Valley. The Arava Institute is considering establishing a joint Master's program with Al-Quds University, the only Arab institution of higher learning in Jerusalem.

All AIES students are required to completes a non-credit bearing Peace-Building and Environmental Leadership Seminar, which provides them with a facilitated forum for expressing their views on race, religion, identity, and the political situation. This is often considered as a successful environmental peacebuilding practice and can make a small, yet important effect on everyday (or local) peace.

Alumni 
Many of the Arava Institute graduates are working in the environmental or peacebuilding field. The institute has created an alumni network to continue supporting alumni by providing personal and professional contacts as well as seed money for alumni projects that demonstrate cross-cultural cooperation. Several alumni of the institute have gone on to work in cross-cultural projects.

 Hashem Shahin, a Muslim Palestinian alumnus, is part of a joint Israeli-Palestinian project to discover the genetic basis of deafness. 
 Tamar Keinan, a Jewish Israeli alumna, joined a Jordanian alumnus to create the "Good Neighbors Water Project" for Friends of the Earth Middle East. 
 Laithi Gnaim, an Israeli Arab alumnus, established a nongovernmental organization called "Arrasid" (Bearing Witness) which trains Arab farmers in the Beit Netofa Valley in sustainable farming techniques. He has used connections made at the Arava Institute to offer training in sustainable practices and bui Arab-Jewish partnerships in the agricultural sector.
 Maya Negev, a Jewish Israeli alumna, working at the Herzog Center for Policy in Tel Aviv University

Others are working in NGOs working on solutions to hygiene and energy in rural and poor areas, working on environmental education and awareness, activists in peace-related activities and more.

The Arava Institute has recently added a new network to build more connections between alumni. The Arava Alumni Peace and Environmental Network (AAPEN) brings together alumni from all years of study during an annual conference held in varying locations in the Middle East, as well as an online presence on Facebook, a private online network (NING), updated pages on the Arava website for alumni, a newsletter, and more.

Research centers 
In addition to its academic programs, the Arava Institute conducts cross-border studies in four research centers:
 
 The Center for Hyper-Arid Socio-Ecology (CHASE), directed by Dr. Miri Lavi Neeman, is dedicated to the study of the natural ecosystems in the Arava valley and the interaction between those ecosystems and the region's people. The center brings together Jordanian and Israeli researchers to map the biodiversity of the region, in order to better protect natural resources while enabling sustainable human development in the region. Projects include monitoring of the 2014 Evrona Oil Spill.
 The Center for Renewable Energy and Energy Conservation (CREEC), directed by Dr. Tareq abu Hamed, conducts research in a wide variety of subjects focusing on energy policy, solar fuels, photovoltaic technologies, biomass, wind and solar thermal energy, as well as innovative building construction techniques customized to conserve energy in desert climates.

 The Center for Sustainable Agriculture (CSA), directed by Dr. Elaine Solowey, is dedicated to the investigation and preservation of arid lands and their natural resources. Among the center's notable projects are the sprouting of a 2,000 year old date seed, nicknamed "Methuselah", and the revival of the frankincense tree in Israel 1,500 years after its last appearance in the region.
 The Center for Transboundary Water Management (CTWM), directed by Dr. Clive Lipchin, provides a platform for water professionals and policy makers from Israel, Palestine and Jordan to cooperate in water conservation, desalination, wastewater treatment and education. Its project include the installation of greywater treatment systems in Israel and the West Bank, and research on sinkholes and desalination in the Dead Sea basin.

In addition, the Arava Center for Sustainable Development (ACSD), under the supervision of Dr. Shmuel Brenner, aims to reduce poverty, enhance sustainability and empower communities by supporting locally driven, environmentally focused development programs worldwide. One of those programs is the agricultural development program "Furrows in the Desert" in Turkana, Kenya, which intends to create greater food security to the region by building local capacity in sustainable agriculture.

See also 
 Alon Tal

References

External links 

Official site
Arava on CNN
Leichman, Abigail Klein. (2012, May 29). "The surprising source of Israel’s edible exports," Israel21c

Ben-Gurion University of the Negev
Education in Israel
Environmental research institutes
Environmental studies institutions in Israel
International educational organizations
International research institutes
Judaism and environmentalism
Ketura, Israel
Research institutes in Israel
Study abroad programs